The following is a very incomplete list of engravings by the German painter and engraver Albrecht Dürer.

Sources
 Borer (Alain) & Bon (Cécile). L'oeuvre Graphique De Albrecht Dürer. Hubschmid & Bouret. 1980.

References

 

Durer